Alberto Jorge Fouillioux Ahumada  (22 November 1940 – 23 June 2018) was a Chilean football midfielder and striker who earned 70 caps and scored 12 goals for the Chile national team during his career.

Career
Fouillioux made his debut for Universidad Católica in 1957. He was part of two championship winning sides in 1961 and 1966. He played for Chile in two World Cups; the 1962 and 1966.

In 1969, he joined Huachipato and in 1972 he played for Unión Española. In the latter part of his career he played for Lille in France.

After retiring as a player Fouillioux went on to become a manager, serving as head coach of Huachipato and Colo-Colo.

Fouillioux died on June 23, 2018 aged 77 in his birth city of Santiago, Chile.

Personal life
From 1989 to 2000, Fouillioux worked as a football commentator and analyst for the Chilean TV channel Canal 13, making a renowned pair alongside Néstor Isella in the TV program . In addition, he worked for Canal 11,  and Radio Agricultura.

His son , is a sports journalist who has worked for Fox Sports Chile and TNT Sports Chile. Another son, Alberto Jr., played for Chile at under-20 level in training matches for the 1987 FIFA World Youth Championship, but he didn't take part of the final squad.

Honours
Universidad Católica
 Chilean Primera División (2): 1961, 1966
Chile
 FIFA World Cup third place: 1962
  (2): , 
  (1):

References

External links
 International statistics at rsssf
 Profile on the Universidad Católica website 
 

1940 births
2018 deaths
Chilean people of French descent
Footballers from Santiago
Chilean footballers
Chile international footballers
Chilean expatriate footballers
Club Deportivo Universidad Católica footballers
C.D. Huachipato footballers
Unión Española footballers
Lille OSC players
Chilean Primera División players
Ligue 1 players
Ligue 2 players
1962 FIFA World Cup players
1966 FIFA World Cup players
Chilean expatriate sportspeople in France
Expatriate footballers in France
Association football midfielders
Chilean football managers
Club Deportivo Universidad Católica managers
Huachipato managers
Colo-Colo managers
Chilean Primera División managers
Chilean association football commentators
Chilevisión color commentators
Chilean radio personalities